Modris is a 2014 Latvian drama film written and directed by Juris Kursietis. It was screened in the Contemporary World Cinema section at the 2014 Toronto International Film Festival. The film was selected as the Latvian entry for the Best Foreign Language Film at the 88th Academy Awards but it was not nominated.

Cast
 Rēzija Kalniņa as Mother
 Kristers Piksa as Modris

See also
 List of submissions to the 88th Academy Awards for Best Foreign Language Film
 List of Latvian submissions for the Academy Award for Best Foreign Language Film

References

External links
 

2014 films
2014 drama films
Latvian drama films
Latvian-language films